Wellington is a civil parish in the district of Telford and Wrekin, Shropshire, England.  It contains 44 listed buildings that are recorded in the National Heritage List for England.  Of these, two are at Grade II*, the middle of the three grades, and the others are at Grade II, the lowest grade.  The parish consists of the town of Wellington, a market town since 1244, and incorporated into Telford new town in 1968.  Most of the listed buildings are houses, shops and associated structures, the earliest of them timber framed.  The other listed buildings include public houses and hotels, churches and associated structures, and two mileposts.


Key

Buildings

References

Citations

Sources

Lists of buildings and structures in Shropshire
Listed
Buildings and structures in Telford